Steven Ma Chun-wai (born 26 October 1971) is a Hong Kong actor and singer. In 1993, Ma won a record deal after winning first place at an annual singing contest in Hong Kong, later releasing his debut album, Lucky for Meeting You (幸運就是遇到你), that December. Not long after his singing debut, Ma joined TVB and began filming television dramas, later achieving fame through his supporting role in 1995's legal drama File of Justice IV. Many of Ma's television works are critically acclaimed and are popular successes in Hong Kong, Mainland China, and Southeast Asia, he has starred in several popular TV series, most notably Healing Hands (1998), Return of the Cuckoo (2000), Where the Legend Begins (2002), Steps (2007), A Watchdog's Tale (2009–10), Ghost Writer (2010), The Life and Times of a Sentinel (2011), Storm in a Cocoon (2014) and Deep in the Realm of Conscience (2018). Ma currently holds the record for holding the most "Favourite Character" awards with a total of four recognitions. Ma's best known for his portrayals of historical characters in many period television dramas.

Early life
Ma was born in a family of "grassroots" background. He was raised in the Pak Tin Estate in Sham Shui Po and lived with his father, a bus driver, his mother, three older sisters, and one younger sister. He attended the Pak Tin Catholic Primary School and later the CMA Secondary School.

Music career
In 1993, Ma won first place at an annual singing contest in Hong Kong, also winning a record deal. He released his debut album, Lucky for Meet You (幸運就是遇到你), that December. To promote the album, his record label created the slogan "He's not Leon Lai, he's not Jacky Cheung" to describe Ma's singing talent, which caused their fans to criticise and badmouth Ma.  However, when Ma's contract terminated, Warners did not want to renew their contract.

In 2013, Ma fought in the music scene and participated in the new song 《給媽媽的「倦」》 in the name [二牛」.

TV career

1993-2003
In 1993, Ma signed a per series contract with TVB and portrayed minor roles in various television dramas. In 1994, Ma was cast as the supporting character Dr. Stephen Chan Cheuk-yiu in the fourth instalment of the popular legal drama File of Justice series. The drama was a popular success, and Ma gained his first footstep into TVB series. His portrayal of the intelligent Hong-hei Emperor in the 1998 remake of the popular wuxia novel The Duke of Mount Deer garnered even more interest from critics and producers alike, and Ma began earning leading roles.

In 1998, Ma filmed the ever-popular TV series, "Healing Hands", but unlike his carefree and sunny disposition Dr. Joe character in the said series, from 1998 until his mother's death, Ma was actually deeply depressed over the rapidly declining health of his mother, a cancer patient of 22 years. His mother's death in July 1999 totally devastated him. For months he isolated himself in his bedroom to deal with the pain of losing his beloved mother. Ma eventually put aside his pain to get on with his life. In 2002 he set up a publishing company, and in the same year he published the first of his book series of: Steven Ma's True Tales of Society with Why Suicide? (2002) followed up Steven Ma's Tales of Society: I Am the Patient's Family (2003).

Ma's portrayal of the historical figure Cho Chik in the drama Where the Legend Begins (2002) was both a popular and critical success. Following Where was the popular but critically mixed Perish in the Name of Love (2003), a 30-part television drama remake of the famous Cantonese opera Di Nü Hua. Gradually, Ma began filming more dramas with historical or period backgrounds, in which Ma subsequently became known for.

2005-2006
Ma made acting in the series Virtues of Harmony II, the modern spin-off of the sitcom, Virtues of Harmony, he collaborated with the winner of the 2004 Miss Chinese International Pageant, Linda Chung.

Ma is also the first actor to win the My Favourite Male Character award at the 2006 TVB Anniversary Awards through his performance in the 2006 low-budget period drama Safe Guards (2006).

2007-2011
In 2007, Ma performed in The Brink of Law and A Change of Destiny. In the same year, Ma starred in Steps which he have been nominated in TVB Anniversary Award for Best Actor (Top 10), nominated in TVB Anniversary Award for My Favourite Male Character (Top 10) and nominated in Astro Drama Awards for Most Unforgettable Kiss (with Bernice Liu).

In 2008, Ma collaborated with Linda Chung in A Journey Called Life which he praise his co-star Linda Chung, for her beauty, good manner, and ripe acting. The two have worked together in a previous collaboration of Virtues of Harmony II. In 2009 and 2010, Ma again collaborated with Linda Chung with two series, A Watchdog's Tale and Ghost Writer. A Watchdog's Tale released in 2009 actually, but the series got the highest audience rating in the first season in 2010 and top five series in audience rating in the whole year. Meanwhile, Ghost Writer released in 2010 with Ma won Astro Drama Awards for My Top 10 Favourite TV Characters and have been nominated in TVB Anniversary Award for Best Actor (Top 5)

In 2010, Ma performed in Links to Temptation with Fala Chen. He and Fala Chen previously work together in Steps, A Journey Called Life and Ghost Writer.

In 2011, Ma filmed in 7 Days in Life where he played Calvin Yik Cho-on (易早安), a professional thief who, along with his girlfriend Christy (played by Sonija Kwok), robs the irresponsible rich and donates a portion of their stolen fortune to charity. Ma considers Calvin to be one of his first breakthrough roles in his acting career. He also expressed many times in interviews that he wants to try out a villain role, explains that Calvin is "a jerk. He's horny, greedy, and even abducts children, but he's actually a very complex character. He has a painful secret that haunts him." Ma further said, "I can now finally challenge a character who is somewhat villainous." Leung (Executive producer(s)) remarked that Calvin is "so evil that he oozes juice" (a Cantonese phrase meaning "pure evil") but Ma argues that Calvin does have a softer side to him and that he's not completely heartless. The role requires Ma to consistently speak Thai, and he carries a dictionary to the film set every day. Later, Ma performed in The Life and Times of a Sentinel. He played Nip Dor-po (聶多寶). Ma says that Dor-po is the most complicated character he has come across. "I have to officially protect the three (Hao-chong, Hong-hei, and Fuk-tsuen), but at the same time, the three are using me to deal with each other [...] but Hao-chong wants me to die, [Fuk-tsuen] wants me to die, and how can I find ways to save myself and Hong-hei?"

2012-2014: Left TVB, work with TVB independently

Ma collaborated with Linda Chung in TVB drama comedy series Daddy Good Deeds who he played Lam Fa's (林發) character, friend and boyfriend to Ko Yu-chu (高如珠) (character played by Linda Chung). Ma praised Linda Chung that her professional attitude and acting, Ma also mentioned that she was still maintaining the purity of heart and having progress in her acting continually. He and  Linda Chung collaborated five times in TVB, was a terrific couple on screen. Later, Ma left TVB because he do not want to renew his contract and joined Hutchison Telecom in January 2012, which ended his 19 years tenure at TVB. Later in August the same year, he announced that he would return to TVB in April 2013 as a head contract. However he has continued to work with TVB independently, starring in their 2014 TVB series, Storm in a Cocoon with Tavia Yeung, Natalie Tong and Evergreen Mak. Ma also filming a new show named Property Protector.

2018-present: Comeback
Ma made a comeback in the TVB series Deep in the Realm of Conscience collaborated with Nancy Wu which he played role as Li Longji. In June 2018, Ma perform a stage play that represents Xu Zhimo. In July 2018, he will move to Singapore to hold two stage performances.
In September 2018, he went to Beijing to start a two-year EMBA study career, and in January 2019 he will play another stage play. And in April 2019, he would also shoot his first movie.

Personal life
After his mother died in 1999, he suffered from depression and panic disorder. He got out of clinical depression in 2007, but the panic disorder remains, and he is depending on medication for it.

Filmography

Film

Television

Discography
1993: Lucky for Meeting You (幸運就是遇到你)
1994: Heading Towards You Now (這刻向你衝)
1995: Deep Passion – New Songs + Special Selection (濃情—新曲+精選)
1996: I Was Also Drunk Before (我也曾醉過) – Mandarin Chinese record
1997: Honey (蜜糖)
1998: DAYNIGHT
1999: Lifestyle
2000: Lifestyle II
2001: Give Me 3'07" (給我3'07")
2001: My Most Missed –  New Songs + Special Selection (我最關心—新歌+精選)
2002: Warner Best MV of 25 Years Karaoke VCD – Various Artist I (華納精采視聽25載卡拉OK VCD叱吒傳奇 – 叱吒群星I)
05. "Long Nights, Many Dreams" (夜長夢多)
2002: Warner Best MV of 25 Years Karaoke VCD – Various Artist II (華納精采視聽25載卡拉OK VCD叱吒傳奇 – 叱吒群星II)
11. "Don't Be Sad" (不再悲觀)
2002: Warner Best MV of 25 Years Karaoke VCD – Various Artist III (華納精采視聽25載卡拉OK VCD叱吒傳奇 – 叱吒群星III)
"Lucky for Meeting You" (幸運就是遇到你)
2002: Greatest Hits Steven – New Songs + Special Selection
2002: Don't Shut In & Self-Abuse (切勿自閉、糟蹋自己)
2003: New Princess Cheung-ping (新帝女花)
2003: My Theme Song (我的主題曲)
2006: EEG TVB Kids Song Selection (EEG TVB 兒歌大放送)
11. "After School ICU" (After School ICU Theme)
2008: Love TV (Love TV 情歌精選)
04. "Little Story" (A Journey Called Life Theme)
2009: Love TV 2 (Love TV 情歌精選 2)
14. "How to Say Love" (Sweetness in the Salt Theme)

Collaborate
Steven Ma had collaborated with actress where there is a terrific couple on screen.

Other works

Television songs

Awards & Nominations

2018
 2018: (TVB Anniversary Gala) My Favourite TVB Drama Character (Singapore) Nomination (Deep in the Realm of Conscience)  
 2018: (TVB Anniversary Gala) My Favourite TVB Drama Character (Malaysia) Nomination(Deep in the Realm of Conscience)

Publications
September 2002: Steven Ma's Veritable Records of Society I: Why Commit Suicide? (馬浚偉社會實錄I-點解要自殺?)
May 2003: Steven Ma's Veritable Records of Society II: I Am the Patient's Family (馬浚偉社會實錄II-我是病人家屬)
May 2004: Steven ma's Veritable Records of Society III: To Good Direction, To Bad Direction (馬浚偉社會實錄III-向好走 向壞走)
July 2003: The Women In Ma Jai's Eyes (馬仔眼中的女人)
July 2008: Correct Designs (圖文並謬)
July 2011: Steven Ma comfortable Eating Attitudes (馬浚偉自在飲食態度)

References

External links
Official yahoo blog of Steven Ma
 Official weibo of Steven Ma

|-
! colspan="3" style="background: #DAA520;" | TVB Anniversary Awards
|-

1971 births
Living people
Hong Kong male film actors
Hong Kong male singers
Hong Kong Mandopop singers
Hong Kong singer-songwriters
Hong Kong male television actors
TVB veteran actors
20th-century Hong Kong male actors
21st-century Hong Kong male actors